The 2010 Western Michigan Broncos football team represented Western Michigan University during the 2010 NCAA Division I FBS football season. The Broncos, led by sixth-year head coach Bill Cubit, compete in the West Division of the Mid-American Conference and played their home games at Waldo Stadium. They finished the season 6–6, 5–3 in MAC play.

Western Michigan, along with Temple, were the only bowl eligible teams that did not receive an invitation to a postseason bowl game.

Schedule

References

Western Michigan
Western Michigan Broncos football seasons
Western Michigan Broncos football